The 2nd Guards Separate Special Purpose Brigade is a Spetsnaz GRU brigade of the Russian Armed Forces based in Promezhitsy, Pskov Oblast.

History 
As part of increases to the GRU's Spetsnaz, on July 19, 1962, General Staff of the USSR Armed Forces Directive No. 140547 was issued, by which the 2nd Spetsnaz Brigade was to be formed in the Leningrad Military District. The creation of the brigade began on September 17, 1962 and ended on March 1, 1963.

Until 2008 or 2013, Dmitry Utkin served as lieutenant colonel and brigade commander of a unit of special forces of Russia's Main Intelligence Directorate (GRU), the 700th Independent Spetsnaz Detachment of the 2nd Independent Brigade.

The Brigade is reportedly taking part in the Russian invasion of Ukraine. On July 11, 2022, Russian president Vladimir Putin awarded the unit the honorific unit status ''Guards'' for its actions in Ukraine.

Composition 
The brigade comprises:
 Headquarters
 Signals Battalion (2x Company)
 Support Company
 70th Special Purpose Detachment (roughly battalion equivalent)
 329th Special Purpose Detachment
 700th Special Purpose Detachment
 Training Battalion (2x Company)

References

Military units and formations established in 1962
Military units and formations of the 2022 Russian invasion of Ukraine
Spetsnaz brigades of Russia